Poul Christian Toft Jensen (14 August 1912 – 18 January 2000) was a Danish amateur association football player, who played 13 games for the Denmark national football team from 1935 to 1938. Born in Slagelse, Jensen played as a midfielder for AB. Jensen was not a technically gifted player, but had a great stamina and was often among the best players for the Danish national team.

References

1912 births
2000 deaths
Danish men's footballers
Denmark international footballers
Akademisk Boldklub players
People from Slagelse
Association football midfielders
Sportspeople from Region Zealand